(+)-δ-Selinene synthase (EC 4.2.3.76) is an enzyme with systematic name (2E,6E)-farnesyl-diphosphate diphosphate-lyase ((+)-δ-selinene-forming). This enzyme catalyses the following chemical reaction

 (2E,6E)-farnesyl diphosphate  (+)-δ-selinene + diphosphate

Initial cyclization gives germacrene C in an enzyme bound form.

References

External links 
 

EC 4.2.3